The Oval is an oval-shaped sunken lawn on the Stanford University campus in Stanford, California, United States.

The lawn once had a statue called Faith. The Olmsted Brothers recommend removing the statue in 1914.

References

External links

 The Oval, Stanford University
 Use of the Oval Policy, Stanford University

Stanford University places